= Frans Swagers =

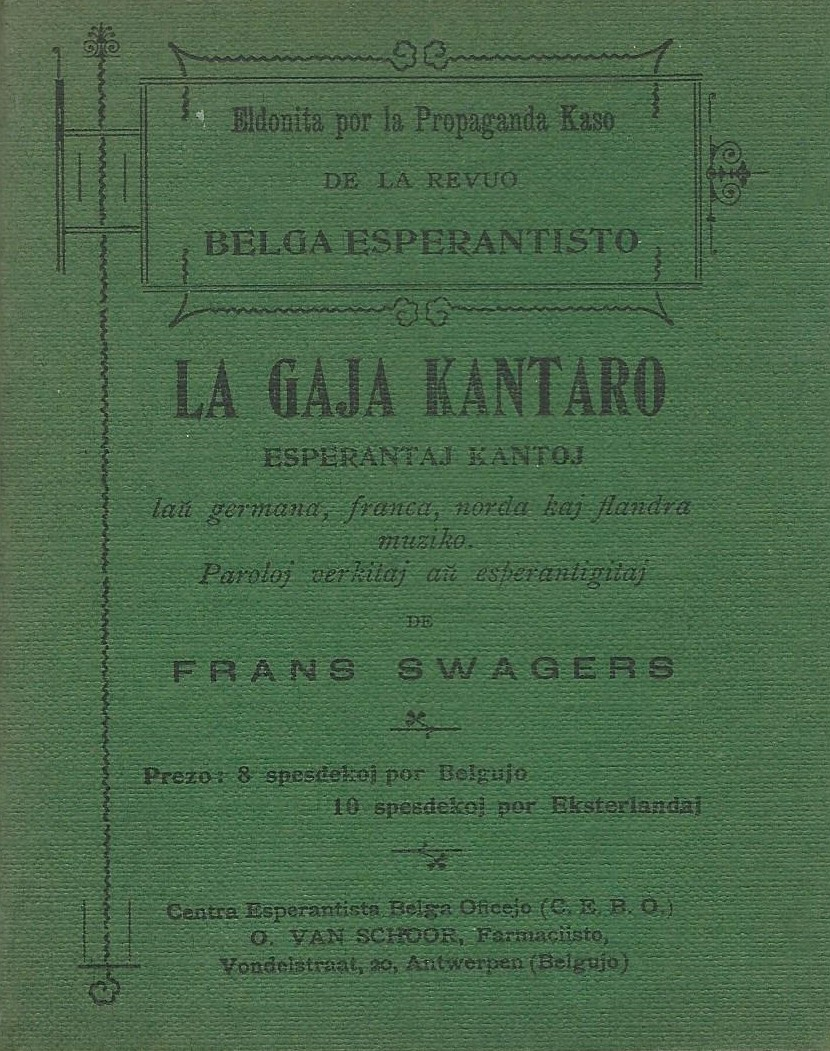
La Gaja Kantaro, circa 1928

Frans Swagers (born 27 January 1870 in Antwerp, died March 7, 1935, Antwerp) was a teacher and author of language courses.

After basic education in Antwerp, he earned a teaching diploma in Ghent. On October 1, 1887, he became a teacher at the Urban Schools of Antwerp.

He wrote textbooks for the French, English and German languages using the popular Gouïn method, based on the ideas of Nicolas Gouïn Dufief, (1776–1834), a Frenchman whose wrote an essay entitled The Philosophy of Language during a visit in the United States. The first known edition was published in 1904; it was republished again in the 1940s.

Swagers was also active in the Esperanto movement. Together with Adolf Finet, he pushed the Esperanto course Esperanto. La Ĉiutaga Vivo (Everyday Living Esperanto) for Dutch- and French-speaking learners using the same method. Similar courses for German- and English-speaking learners followed.
